Grease is a 2010 music party video game for the Wii and Nintendo DS video game consoles based on the 1978 film of the same name, itself based on the eponymous 1971 musical. 505 Games published the game along with Paramount Digital Entertainment as a part of a partnership. It was later followed in 2011 by the release of the video game Grease Dance for the PlayStation 3 and Xbox 360 Kinect.

Gameplay
The game involves following the moves shown by the characters on the screen to a song from the film.

Development
505 Games have announced that Zoë Mode and Big Head Games are signed on to develop the game. Zoe Mode are best known for developing such games as the SingStar series and the EyeToy: Play games. Big Head Games is a small video game publisher/developer responsible for a few iPhone/iPod Touch games including one based on The Terminator movie.

References

External links
Wii version @ IGN.com
DS version @ IGN.com

2010 video games
505 Games games
Grease (musical)
Multiplayer and single-player video games
Music video games
Nintendo DS games
Video games based on adaptations
Video games based on films
Video games developed in the United Kingdom
Wii games
Zoë Mode games